Lead halide refers to any of a group of chemical compounds in which lead is joined to an element from the halide group.

Compounds within this group include:

Lead(II) fluoride
Lead(II) chloride
Lead(II) bromide
Lead(II) iodide